The Arena Football League 25 Greatest Players was compiled in 2012 to show the league's top 25 players in its 25-year history.

References

Arena Football League trophies and awards